The Sea and Cake is an American indie rock band with a jazz influence, based in Chicago, Illinois, United States.

The group formed in the mid-1990s from members of The Coctails (Archer Prewitt), Shrimp Boat (Sam Prekop and Eric Claridge), and Tortoise (John McEntire); the group's name came from a willful reinterpretation (as the result of an accidental miscomprehension) of "The C in Cake", a song by Gastr del Sol.  Starting with 1997's The Fawn, the group has relied on electronic sound sources, such as drum machines and synthesizers, to color its music, but has retained its distinctive post-jazz combo style.  The band has shied away from releasing singles, preferring the album format.  Contrary to his multi-instrumentalist role in Tortoise, John McEntire almost exclusively plays drums in The Sea and Cake.

Members Sam Prekop, Archer Prewitt, and John McEntire each have released solo albums. The cover art of The Sea And Cake's releases are largely paintings by member Eric Claridge and photographs by Prekop. Prewitt has been involved in publishing his own comic books and doing graphic design.

In 1995, the band contributed the song "The Fontana" to the AIDS benefit album Red Hot + Bothered produced by the Red Hot Organization. The band was on hiatus from 2004 to 2007. Their most recent album Any Day was released in May 2018.

Members
Sam Prekop (vocals, guitar)
Archer Prewitt (guitar, piano, vocals)
John McEntire (percussion, drums, some synthesizer)

Discography
All releases on Thrill Jockey Records unless noted.

Studio albums
 The Sea and Cake (1994)
 Nassau (1995)
 The Biz (1995)
 The Fawn (1997)
 Oui (2000)
 One Bedroom (2003)
 Everybody (2007)
 Car Alarm (2008)
 The Moonlight Butterfly (2011)
 Runner (2012)
 Any Day (2018)

EPs and singles
 "Glad You're Right" (b/w "Tiger Panther," "Crimson Wing", 7" single, 1995, Lissy's Records [LISS1], limited edition of 500)
 Two Gentlemen (12" EP, mainly remixes, 1997)
 "Window Lights" (b/w "Setup For Bed" (a solo piece by John McEntire), 7" single, 1999, Hefty Records [HEF013], also on Reach the Rock soundtrack, 1999)
 Glass (CD EP, 2003)

Compilations
 A Brief Historical Retrospective (CD, 1997, Japanese-only compilation of first 2 albums, plus 7" song "Glad You're Right")
''Metro: The Official Bootleg Series, Volume 1 2010

References

External links

Official website

The Sea and Cake - Video Interview: "What is really important to you?"
Lazy-i Interview from February 2003
Interview with Centerstage Chicago (June 2007)
March 2011 - Métronome / Interview with Sam Prekop (Spanish)

American pop rock music groups
American post-rock groups
Musical groups from Chicago
Thrill Jockey artists